Epilystoides is a genus of beetles in the family Cerambycidae, containing the following species:

 Epilystoides bispinosus Breuning, 1939
 Epilystoides integripennis Breuning, 1942
 Epilystoides unicolor Breuning, 1957

References

Apomecynini
Cerambycidae genera
Taxa named by Stephan von Breuning (entomologist)